John Earl Christensen (December 20, 1919 – January 31, 2015) was an American politician in the state of Wyoming. He served in the Wyoming State Senate as a member of the Republican Party. He served as President of the Wyoming Senate from 1969 to 1971. He attended the University of Wyoming and was a rancher.

References

1919 births
2015 deaths
Presidents of the Wyoming Senate
Republican Party Wyoming state senators
University of Wyoming alumni
Ranchers from Wyoming
People from Newcastle, Wyoming